Unac may refer to:

People
 Sergio Uñac (born 1970), Argentine politician

Places
 Unac (river), Bosnia and Herzegovina
 Unac, Ariège, commune in the Ariège department in southwestern France
 Unac, Plužine, Montenegro

Other
 United Nations Association in Canada